Wolfpassing is a municipality in the district of Scheibbs in the Austrian state of Lower Austria.

Population

References

Cities and towns in Scheibbs District